Korecki (plural: Koreccy, feminine form: Korecka) is a Polish family name belonging to the princely Korecki family. The surname literally means "of Korets" and derives from the  Korets Castle, the original seat of the family. Below are the notable bearers of the surname.

People
  (born 1955), Polish saxophone player
 Samuel Korecki (1586–1622), Polish-Lithuanian nobleman
 Natasha Korecki, American reporter
 Aleksandar Korecki, CEO, Real Estate investor; and rumored to be a direct heir of the Korets Castle.
 Werner Korecki (born 1928), birth name of Werner Boost, German serial killer

Fictional characters
Jan Korecki, a character from a 1903 science fiction novel On the Silver Globe by Jerzy Żuławski

See also
 

Polish-language surnames
Polish toponymic surnames